The 1899 Alabama Crimson White football team (variously "Alabama", "UA" or "Bama") represented the University of Alabama in the 1899 Southern Intercollegiate Athletic Association football season. The team was led by head coach W. A. Martin, in his first season, and played their home games at The Quad in Tuscaloosa, Alabama. In what was the seventh season of Alabama football, the team finished with a record of three wins and one loss (3–1, 1–0 SIAA). In the spring of 1895, the University Board of Trustees passed a rule that prohibited athletic teams from competing off-campus for athletic events. As such the 1898 season was canceled; however the board subsequently rescinded this rule and the squad returned to the field for the 1899 season.

Schedule

Game summaries

Tuscaloosa Athletic Club
In what was the first game played since the 1897 season, Alabama defeated the Tuscaloosa Athletic Club 16–5. With a halftime score of 5–5, Alabama took the lead in the second half and won 16–5. Former Alabama player and head coach Eli Abbott played for the Tuscaloosa squad in this game.

Montgomery Athletic Club
Shirley Miller had a 75-yard touchdown run for Alabama in this 16–0 shutout victory over the Montgomery Athletic Club.

Ole Miss
In what was the first road game for Alabama since the 1895 season, the Crimsons traveled to Jackson, Mississippi and defeated Ole Miss, 7–5, at Driving Park before 600 spectators. After Alabama took a 2–0 lead following a blocked punt for a safety, Mississippi scored their only points of the game on a short touchdown run for the 5–2 lead. In the second half, Alabama scored the game-winning touchdown on an A. M. Donahoo run for the 7–5 victory. The victory brought Alabama's all-time record against Mississippi to 1–1.

New Orleans Athletic Club
The day after their victory over Ole Miss, Alabama traveled to New Orleans and lost, 21–0, to the New Orleans Athletic Club in the final game of the season.

Players

Notes

References

Alabama
Alabama Crimson Tide football seasons
Alabama Crimson White football